Ayangudi may refer to:
 Ayangudi, Cuddalore, town in Cuddalore district of Tamil Nadu, India
 Ayangudi, Thanjavur, village in Orathanadu talik, Thanjuvar district of Tamil Nadu, India